LifePoint Health is an American company that provides healthcare services in growing regions, rural communities and small towns. It was established in 1999 and is headquartered in Brentwood, Tennessee. As of November 16, 2018, it operated 89 hospital campuses in 30 states with more than $6 billion in revenues. In 2011, the company was included in the Hospital Engagement Network by the Department of Health and Human Services, being the only private organization in the country.

History 
In February 2014, LifePoint Health opened its new hospital support center in Brentwood.

In December 2013, Portage Health and LifePoint Health reached a joint venture agreement to share ownership and operation of Portage Health, with about $40 million to fund a charitable foundation.

In June 2013, LifePoint Health completed the acquisition of the Bell Hospital.

LifePoint's Chief Medical Officer, Dr. Lanny Copeland, won the 50 Most Influential Physician Executives by Modern Healthcare and Modern Physician magazines in the year of 2009, 2010 and 2011.

In May 2011, DLP Healthcare, LLC, a joint venture of Duke University Health System and LifePoint Hospitals completed the acquisition of MedCath Partners, LLC.

In January 2011, the Company formed a joint venture with Duke University Health System (Duke).
In 2005, Historic LifePoint Hospitals, Inc. merged with Province Healthcare Company to form the new public company, LifePoint Hospitals, Inc.

In 2015, LifePoint Hospitals Inc. changed its name to LifePoint Health.

In 2018, the company was acquired by a company owned by funds managed by Apollo Management; this included a merger with RCCH Healthcare Partners, which had formed from a merger a few years prior between Capella Health and RegionalCare Hospital Partners.

In 2021, LifePoint Health acquired Kindred Health. LifePoint Health renamed the company ScionHealth in December 2021. After the acquisition, LifePoint now operates hospitals in 25 states. ScionHealth will consist of 79 hospital campuses in 25 states, including Kindred’s 61 long-term acute care hospitals and 18 of LifePoint’s community hospitals and associated health systems.

Products and services 
All the physicians in the company's hospitals are licensed physicians. The services provided by the company's hospitals include inpatient services, like general surgery, emergency room care, radiology, oncology, and pediatric services; and also outpatient services, like same-day surgery, X-ray and respiratory therapy.

Awards 
In November 2013, fifteen LifePoint Health hospitals were considered Top Performers in Key Quality Measures by The Joint Commission. Eleven of LifePoint's hospitals were Top Performers in 2012. On the list of "100 Best Places to Work in Healthcare" by Modern Healthcare, Jackson Purchase Medical Center was ranked 55th in 2010 and 70th in 2009

References

External links 
 Official website

1999 establishments in Tennessee
Companies formerly listed on the Nasdaq
Companies based in Nashville, Tennessee
Hospitals established in 1999
Hospital networks in the United States
Medical and health organizations based in Tennessee
2018 mergers and acquisitions
Private equity portfolio companies
Privately held companies based in Tennessee